The Enhancing Student Mobility through Online Support (ESMOS) project is a European-funded partnership between higher education institutions from Austria, Bulgaria, Italy, Lithuania and the United Kingdom. It has the aims of developing, evaluating and modelling the use of Virtual Learning Environments and online technologies to support students who take part in either a study exchange (ERASMUS) or work placement programme (LEONARDO), spending part of their studies overseas.

ESMOS has generated interesting and relevant research and practice results from the implementation (Case Studies) of the Methodology, IT Support Model and Guidelines for the Online Support of International Mobility Students. These results have been disseminated widely through journal papers, conference papers, presentations, workshops, training sessions, promotional leaflets and media coverage.

The two-year project is funded by the SOCRATES Programme/Minerva Action, which seeks to promote European co-operation in the field of Information and Communication Technology (ICT) and Open and Distance Learning (ODL) in education.

Project partners 
University of Salford, United Kingdom 
University of Calabria, Italy 
FH Joanneum Graz, Austria 
Vytautas Magnus University, Lithuania 
Częstochowa University of Technology, Poland 
D. A. Tsenov Academy of Economics, Bulgaria

See also 
Bologna Process
Erasmus programme
Directorate-General for Education and Culture

References

External links
ESMOS project website
Being Mobile
EUROPA Education and Training
Socrates Minerva

Academia in Europe
Distance education in Europe
European student organizations
Information technology organizations based in Europe